"Mystery of a Blood Red Rose" is a single and opening track to the German power metal project Avantasia's album Ghostlights, released on 11 December 2015 with a lyric video. It was one of the ten candidates to represent Germany at the Eurovision Song Contest 2016. The song was between the final three finalists, but eventually was defeated by "Ghost", performed by Jamie-Lee Kriewitz.

Composing and recording 
Tobias Sammet, the project's leader and songwriter, described the song as "sumptuous" and similar to "Meat Loaf around 1979 or at most 1990". He also said:

Indeed, the choirs took a total 14 hours to record. Meat Loaf was initially set to sing on the song, and his management was already in the process of approving it. However, they ultimately decided to decline for unknown reasons. The song was still no more than a single chorus when the idea of having him sing on it was first raised, but a more complete version of it was sent to him.

Commenting on the reasons he chose the song as the single, he said it was either it or "Draconian Love", since both are "very catchy" and "had a solid playtime to release them as a single". The label favored the opening track, which Sammet liked as the song was more "daring" due to its "timelessness" and "old-fashioned" tone.

Eurovision 2016 

"Mystery of a Blood Red Rose" was selected among nine other songs as a candidate to represent Germany at the Eurovision Song Contest 2016. Sammet said it could be a great promotional opportunity and commented:

When asked if he was afraid conservative fans would dislike Avantasia's participation due to the pop, commercial nature of Eurovision, Sammet replied:

He remarked it will be "weird" to compete with other people in art, which he sees as "subjective".

The song was between the three songs competing in the final of "Unser Lied für Stockholm". In the final round, "Mystery of a Blood Red Rose" received 21.6% of the public vote, finishing in third place. The song "Ghost", performed by Jamie-Lee Kriewitz, was chosen as the German representative in the Eurovision Song Contest 2016.

The song was chosen as the German entry for the OGAE Second Chance Contest 2016, where it finished in tenth place.

Personnel
 Tobias Sammet - lead vocals, additional keyboards and bass
 Sascha Paeth - lead and rhythm guitar, bass, additional keyboards, engineering and mixing
 Michael Rodenberg - orchestration, keyboards, mastering
 Felix Bohnke - drums

References

2015 singles
2015 songs
Avantasia songs
Nuclear Blast Records singles